Red Eye Louie's Vodquila is a blend of vodka and tequila, which is produced by Red Eye Louie's. The primary ingredients include vodka, 6 times distilled and made from multiple grains and tequila made from the agave plant. It is bottled at 40% alcohol by volume. (80 Proof)

The three co-founders, Chander, Nina, and Romie Arora created the product in 2011. Headquartered in Alabama, with offices in New York as well, Red Eye Louie’s Vodquila is available in 30 states in the United States as well as the UK, Spain, Portugal, Australia, Egypt, and Alberta, .

History
Vodquila was originally created in 2011 when co-founder Nina Arora had where she needed to come up with a new marketable product. She created the initial product at home, and tested it first with her father and brother. The three decided they had a marketable product and further developed the recipe and packaging.

The name "Red Eye Louie's Vodquila" came about when the Alcohol and Tobacco Tax and Trade Bureau rejected their initial proposal of marketing the product under the simple name "Vodquila", claiming that the family had created an entirely new product category (vodquila) and therefore needed a more specific brand name for their product.

Product information 
Red Eye Louie's Vodquila is currently available in the following sizes:
 700ml glass / 6 pack
 750ml glass/ 6 pack
 750ml glass/ 12 pack
 375ml glass/ 24 pack
 50ml plastic/ 60 pack
 50ml glass  / 50 pack

1 liter size bottles were released in the second quarter of 2016.

Awards

Sources 
 
 
 
 
 
 
 
 
 

American distilled drinks
2011 establishments in Alabama